Veach is a surname. Notable people with the surname include:

Al Veach (1909–1990), American baseball player
Bobby Veach (1888–1945), American baseball player
Charles L. Veach (1944–1995), United States Air Force officer and astronaut
Eric Veach, a Canadian computer scientist.
Lynn Veach Sadler, American poet, writer and playwright
Matt Veach (born 1981), American mixed martial artist
Peek-A-Boo Veach (1862–1937), American baseball player
Zach Veach (born 1994), American racing driver